The 2014–15 UAB Blazers men's basketball team represented the University of Alabama at Birmingham during the 2014–15 NCAA Division I men's basketball season. The Blazers, led by third year head coach Jerod Haase, played their home games at Bartow Arena. They were members of Conference USA. They finished the season 20–16, 12–6 in C-USA play to finish in a tie for fourth place. They defeated WKU, Louisiana Tech, and Middle Tennessee to become champions of the C-USA tournament. They received the conference's automatic bid to the NCAA tournament as a No. 14 seed where they upset No. 3-seeded and No. 9-ranked Iowa State in the first round before losing in the second round to No. 11-seeded UCLA.

Previous season
The Blazers finished the 2013–14 season 18–13, 7–9 in C-USA play to finish in a tie for eighth place. They lost in the second round of the C-USA tournament to Charlotte.

Departures

Incoming Transfers

Class of 2014 recruits

Class of 2015 recruits

Roster

Schedule

|-
!colspan=9 style=| Exhibition

|-
!colspan=9 style=| Non-conference regular season

|-
!colspan=12 style=| Conference USA regular season

|-
!colspan=9 style=| Conference USA tournament

|-
!colspan=9 style="| NCAA tournament

References

UAB Blazers men's basketball seasons
UAB
UAB